The Lower Humbert Covered Bridge, or the Faidley Covered Bridge, is an  Burr Arch truss covered bridge that crosses Laurel Hill Creek, in Lower Turkeyfoot Township, Somerset County in the U.S. state of Pennsylvania. It was built in 1891 and was listed on the National Register of Historic Places on December 10, 1980. It is one of the ten remaining covered bridges in Somerset County.

History 
The covered bridge was built in 1891. It was rebuilt in 1991, with extensive reinforcement work done on the abutments. A homemade explosive device caused minor damage to bridge deck in January 2006.

See also 
 List of covered bridges on the National Register of Historic Places in Pennsylvania
 National Register of Historic Places listings in Somerset County, Pennsylvania

References

External links

Bridges completed in 1891
Covered bridges on the National Register of Historic Places in Pennsylvania
Covered bridges in Somerset County, Pennsylvania
Bridges in Somerset County, Pennsylvania
Wooden bridges in Pennsylvania
Tourist attractions in Somerset County, Pennsylvania
1891 establishments in Pennsylvania
National Register of Historic Places in Somerset County, Pennsylvania
Road bridges on the National Register of Historic Places in Pennsylvania
Burr Truss bridges in the United States